"Me Against the Night" is a song written by Pat Bunch, Pam Rose, and Mary Ann Kennedy, and recorded by American country music artist Crystal Gayle.  It was released in October 1984 as the fourth single from the album Cage the Songbird.  The song reached number 4 on the Billboard Hot Country Singles & Tracks chart.

Chart performance

References

1985 singles
Crystal Gayle songs
Songs written by Pam Rose
Songs written by Mary Ann Kennedy (American singer)
Song recordings produced by Jimmy Bowen
Songs written by Pat Bunch
Warner Records singles
1983 songs